Leon Williams may refer to:
 Leon Williams (American football) (born 1983), American football linebacker
 Leon Williams (baseball) (1905–1984), Major League Baseball player
 Leon Williams (boxer) (born 1983), British boxer
 Leon Williams (basketball, born 1986), basketball player
 Leon Williams (basketball, born 1991), Dutch basketball player
 Leon Jay Williams (born 1976), Eurasian Singaporean singer and actor
 Leon Norman Williams (1914–1999), British philatelic writer
 Leon Williams (actor), British theatre actor